Lake Komořany is a former lake in the Czech Republic that is now non-existent as it has dried up. It was located in the Ore Mountains in the northwestern part of the country.

Former lakes of Europe
Lakes of the Czech Republic